The International Nomenclature of Cosmetic Ingredients (INCI) are the unique identifiers for cosmetic ingredients such as waxes, oils, pigments, and other chemicals that are assigned in accordance with rules established by the Personal Care Products Council (PCPC), previously the Cosmetic, Toiletry, and Fragrance Association (CTFA). INCI names often differ greatly from systematic chemical nomenclature or from more common trivial names and is a mixture of conventional scientific names, Latin and English words. INCI nomenclature conventions "are continually reviewed and modified when necessary to reflect changes in the industry, technology, and new ingredient developments".

INCI and CAS 

The relationship between a CAS Registry Number and an INCI name is not always one-to-one. In some cases, more than one INCI name may have the same CAS number, or more than one CAS number may apply to an INCI name. For example, the CAS number 1245638-61-2 has the CA Index Name of 2-Propenoic acid, reaction products with pentaerythritol. This CAS number can accurately be associated with two INCI names: Pentaerythrityl Tetraacrylate and Pentaerythrityl Triacrylate. Alternatively, the INCI name, Glucaric Acid can be associated with two CAS numbers: 87-73-0 which has the CA Index Name of D-Glucaric acid, and 25525-21-7, which has the CA Index Name of DL-Glucaric acid. Both of these examples are accurate associations between CAS and INCI.

Table of common names 

Here is a table of several common names and their corresponding INCI names.

* Some common names and INCI names are the same name.

INCI labeling 

In the U.S., under the Food, Drug, and Cosmetic Act and the Fair Packaging and Labeling Act, certain accurate information is a requirement to appear on labels of cosmetic products. In Canada, the regulatory guideline is the Cosmetic Regulations. Ingredient names must comply by law with EU requirements by using INCI names.

The cosmetic regulation laws are enforceable for important consumer safety. For example, the ingredients are listed on the ingredient declaration for the purchaser to reduce the risk of an allergic reaction to an ingredient the user has had an allergy to before. INCI names are mandated on the ingredient statement of every consumer personal care product. The INCI system allows the consumer to identify the ingredient content. In the U.S., true soaps (as defined by the FDA) are specifically exempted from INCI labeling requirements as cosmetics per FDA regulation.

See also 
 Ingredients of cosmetics
 Cosmetic, Toiletry, and Fragrance Association (CTFA)
 Registration, Evaluation, Authorisation and Restriction of Chemicals (REACH)
 List of cosmetic ingredients

References

External links 

 European Commission: Cosmetic Ingredients Database
 FDA: Labeling Claims
 A to Z INCI Database 
 FDA: Cosmetic Labeling Guide

Soaps
Cosmetics
Chemical nomenclature
International classification systems